Vallaris is a genus of plants in the family Apocynaceae first described as a genus in 1768. It is native to China, the Indian Subcontinent, and Southeast Asia.

Species
 Vallaris glabra (L.) Kuntze – bread flower, kesidang (Malay) – Java, Flores, Sumatra; naturalized in W Malaysia, Thailand, Christmas Island
 Vallaris indecora (Baill.) Tsiang & P.T.Li – Guangxi, Guizhou, Sichuan, Yunnan
 Vallaris solanacea  (Roth) Kuntze – India, Sri Lanka, Pakistan, Nepal, Bhutan, Bangladesh, Cambodia, Laos, Myanmar, Thailand, Vietnam, Hainan; naturalized in Andaman Islands

formerly included
 Vallaris anceps = Kibatalia macrophylla  
 Vallaris angustifolia  = Kibatalia gitingensis  
 Vallaris arborea = Kibatalia macrophylla  
 Vallaris clavata = Echites clavatus 
 Vallaris daronensis = Kibatalia maingayi  
 Vallaris divaricata = Strophanthus divaricatus  
 Vallaris fimbriata = Euphorbia mammillaris 
 Vallaris gitingensis = Kibatalia gitingensis  
 Vallaris ipecacuanhae = Euphorbia ipecacuanhae 
 Vallaris lancifolia = Vallariopsis lancifolia  
 Vallaris laxiflora = Pottsia laxiflora 
 Vallaris macrantha = Beaumontia macrantha  
 Vallaris maingayi = Kibatalia maingayi  
 Vallaris missurica = Euphorbia missurica  
 Vallaris portulacoides = Euphorbia portulacoides 
 Vallaris × uniflora = Euphorbia × uniflora

References

Further reading
Ng, F.S.P. (2006). Tropical Horticulture and Gardening. Clearwater Publications, Kuala Lumpur, Malaysia, 361 p., .

Apocynaceae genera
Apocyneae
Taxa named by Nicolaas Laurens Burman